German Comic Con is a fan convention organised by Cool Conventions and Showmasters Events first held at the Westfalenhallen in Dortmund in December 2015. It was the first event of its kind, modeled after the San Diego and New York Comic Cons, and has since taken place in Dortmund, Munich, Berlin, and Frankfurt.

German Comic Con has been affiliated with Comic Con Ahoy in Rotterdam, Filmbörse, German Castle Con, and Weekend of Hell. The Rudolph Dirks Award is presented at German Comic Con.

Locations and dates

References

2015 establishments in Germany
Comics conventions
Conventions in Germany
Recurring events established in 2015